First use may refer to:
 First use of nuclear weapons
 No first use (of nuclear weapons)
 Trust on first use (computing)
 First use of drugs in relation to the potential becoming addicted immediately

See also 
 First-time user experience
 First strike (disambiguation)